Sarathropezus conicipennis is a species of beetle in the family Cerambycidae, and the only species in the genus Sarathropezus. It was described by Kolbe in 1893.

References

Ancylonotini
Beetles described in 1893
Monotypic beetle genera